Smyrna Landing is an unincorporated community in Kent and New Castle counties of Delaware, United States. Smyrna Landing is located along Smyrna Landing Road at the crossing of Duck Creek, east of Smyrna.

References 

Unincorporated communities in Kent County, Delaware
Unincorporated communities in New Castle County, Delaware
Unincorporated communities in Delaware